WZBJ-CD (channel 19) is a low-power, Class A television station licensed to Lynchburg, Virginia, United States. It is a translator of Danville-licensed MyNetworkTV affiliate WZBJ (channel 24) which is owned by Gray Television; the WZBJ stations collectively serve as a sister outlet to Roanoke-licensed CBS affiliate WDBJ (channel 7). WZBJ-CD's transmitter is located on Candlers Mountain near the campus of the station's former owner, Liberty University; its parent station shares studios with WDBJ on Hershberger Road in northwest Roanoke.

History
The station first came on the air on January 23, 1991, as W19BC channel 19, a translator station for FamilyNet, a network owned at the time by Liberty University founder Jerry Falwell. On September 1, 1991, W19BC began originating programming and became a 24/7 local LPTV station. In 2000, it changed its callsign to WTLU-CA. The station previously branded itself as HopeNow.tv. The station's digital transmitter, WTLU-LD on channel 43, signed on in 2010; in 2012, the analog WTLU-CA transmitter went dark, and its Class A status was transferred to the digital license as WTLU-CD. The call letters changed to WLHG-CD in 2015.

On April 30, 2018, Gray Television announced it would purchase WLHG-CD from Liberty University for $50,000. Under the terms of the transaction, Gray would hold an option agreement to acquire WFFP-TV, and enter into a shared services agreement (to take effect on June 15), whereby Gray would provide programming for and receive a share of the programming and advertising revenue accrued by WLHG-CD and WFFP, which would in turn become sister stations to Gray's existing property in the Roanoke–Lynchburg market, CBS affiliate WDBJ, a station that shares its physical channel spectrum with WFFP.

Gray took control of WLHG-CD as scheduled on June 15. On the same day, it began simulcasting WDBJ's MyNetworkTV subchannel "My 19" on WLHG-CD. While the station moved to Gray's control, the station's PSIP virtual channel system was not in use, rendering WLHG-CD's channels temporarily as 43.3 and 43.4. On September 1, 2018, the call letters were changed to WZBJ-CD, and it began sharing virtual channel 24 with the full-power WZBJ license (which concurrently changed call letters from WFFP-TV).

Subchannels
The station's digital signal is multiplexed:

ATSC 3.0 lighthouse

References

External links
 

Gray Television
MyNetworkTV affiliates
Cozi TV affiliates
Decades (TV network) affiliates
ZBJ-CD
Low-power television stations in the United States
Television channels and stations established in 2010
2010 establishments in Virginia
ATSC 3.0 television stations